The Suncook Lakes are a pair of lakes located in Belknap County in central New Hampshire, United States, in the town of Barnstead. The lakes are connected by a  channel, spanned by a road bridge. A dam at the outlet of Lower Suncook Lake controls the water level of both lakes. The lakes are located along the Suncook River, a tributary of the Merrimack River. There are three islands on Lower Lake.

The lakes are classified as a warmwater fishery, with observed species including smallmouth and largemouth bass, chain pickerel, horned pout, and white perch. Rainbow trout can be found in the deeper Upper Suncook Lake.

See also

List of lakes in New Hampshire

References

Lakes of Belknap County, New Hampshire
Barnstead, New Hampshire
New Hampshire placenames of Native American origin